Nakhon Si Heritage Football Club (Thai สโมสรฟุตบอลนครศรี เฮอริเทจ ) is a Thai semi-professional football club based in  Nakhon Si Thammarat Province. They currently play in Thailand Amateur League

Background

Nakhon Si Thammarat is the biggest province in the South of Thailand with a population of over a million. The locals are regarded as friendly and kind. Nakhon Si Thammarat FC used to be one of the best amateur football clubs with many well-known players such as Anirut Krabdee, Bunnum Suksawad, Udomsak Yeeraham and Somsak Noyhid.  In 1991, the club became the spotlight of the country as they surprisingly reached the final of Yamaha Thailand's Cup against Bangkok FC and won the hearts of many of its fans.

In 2009, the club had such a brilliant run as they went unbeaten in the first half of the season under the coach who used to be a Thai international, Siripong Sirirat. However, the team unfortunately could not find the form they had in the second of the season, therefore they narrowly missed the play-off position for Thai Division 1 League promotion.

In 2010, the club has set a clear goal of getting promoted to the Thai Division 1 League as their priority.  Therefore, a big plan for team rebuilding was expected to happen. Over 5 million baht of budget was planned to be spent but the problem unavoidably arises when there is a re-election of the city mayor. As a result, the club suffer a bit of financial problems due to the delay of funding from the local government. Nevertheless, the problem is hopefully expected to be overcome soon as the local re-election has ended.

Unsurprisingly, this has a big knocked-on effect on the performance of the team.  For instance, the team could not travel to Phuket the day before the match, on February 28, 2010, due to the lack of money. Thus, the players had to travel four hours on the day before the match kicked off at 5 pm. This completely spoils the great potential the team has as it also affects the number of training sessions they can have. They now have three losses out of the four they played.

The strength of the current team is age because the average age is only 25 years old. This shows a great vision of the team policy as they not only trying to get promoted but at the same time they build the team for the future. Most of the players are home-grown players who played for other professional clubs in Thailand.

They are still expected to be one of the favorites in this Division if the financial problem can be solved in the near future. This could possibly happen after the new Mayor of Nakhon Si Thammarat make a press conference about his policies.

At the moment th club is in even worse situation as the chairman is dislike by most fans due to his immature leadership and lack of intelligence. The club now sits at the bottom of the table in Regional League Division 2 and likely to remain there for the rest of the season.

Nickname

Historically, Nakhon Si Thammarat is regarded as the most powerful city in the south of Thailand. The King of the Southern Sea was given by spectators as the nickname of the club.

Club Crest and Colours

The image of the dolphin designed by a group of fans is the club's main crest. It describes the location of the city which is next to the sea and there are plenty of dolphins. It also represent the strong bonding between the locals.

Nakhon Si Thammarat's home colour is now all yellow with purple trim whereas the away colour is the opposite. The club's kit is currently manufactured by Bangkok Diadora.

Supporters

Dolphin Warriors is the nickname given to the club's supporters. Nakhon Si Thammarat FC has both local and foreign fans. Average League attendance in 2010 increases significantly with the better public relations such as advertisements. Due to the financial problem the club is facing this year, the fan are trying their best to help the club financially such as seeking local sponsors and small donation.

Scarf

This is another product designed by the fan clubs without any support from the club. It costs about 300 bhat each.

Timeline

History of events of Nakhon Si Thammarat Football Club

Sponsors

The main source of budget is expected to be from the city council. Plus, other commercials in the city.

Stadium and locations

Season By Season record

P = Played
W = Games won
D = Games drawn
L = Games lost
F = Goals for
A = Goals against
Pts = Points
Pos = Final position

QR1 = First Qualifying Round
QR2 = Second Qualifying Round
R1 = Round 1
R2 = Round 2
R3 = Round 3
R4 = Round 4

R5 = Round 5
R6 = Round 6
QF = Quarter-finals
SF = Semi-finals
RU = Runners-up
W = Winners

Youth Team

U13 Team

U17 Team

References

External links 
 Nakhon Si Thammarat FC Fanclub
 Official Nakhon Si Heritage FC Facebookpage
 Nakhon Si Thammarat FC Facebookpage

Football clubs in Thailand
Association football clubs established in 2009
Nakhon Si Thammarat province
2009 establishments in Thailand